"Right on Time" is a song co-written recorded by Canadian country pop artist Lindsay Ell. She wrote the song with Jordan Schmidt and Geoff Warburton, while Schmidt produced the track.

Background
Ell cited "Right on Time" as her "own theme song", taking inspiration from the idea that "women spend a lot of time feeling like they might miss their ‘time’ in life –their time to be beautiful, to be a mother, to have their dream career, to work their ass off," adding there is "a constant fear that we might miss the very thing we want by focusing on something else" and that she was ”just done worrying about that". She said that the song is for "anyone who needs to hear and be inspired by the idea that you can’t be late to the party in your own life".

Critical reception
Erica Zisman of Country Swag referred to the song as a "bonafide anthem for single people or people who thought they would be somewhere else by now". Music critic Eric Alper stated that the track "introduces a new, clearly confident side of Ell," framing it as "upbeat and incredibly catchy". Front Porch Music described "Right on Time" as "the perfect song to remind you to take a breath, slow down, and embrace the moment that you’re in," calling it an "anthem" for "anyone who felt pressured to follow societal norms". Off the Record UK said that the song is "joyfully fun," adding that "Ell puts a voice to the pressure she feels as a career-focused woman in her 30s". Top Country named the track their "Pick of the Week" for April 29, 2022, saying it "encompasses a strong message about accepting where you are at in life and truly celebrating it". To the Point Music called the track "a reminder that only we define what our lives will be".

Accolades

Music video
The official music video for "Right on Time" premiered on April 27, 2022. It features Ell performing the song for a fictional "Right on Time Support Group" before the rest of the group joins in and celebrates being at the right place in their lives.

Credits and personnel
Credits adapted from AllMusic.

 Sean R. Badum – engineering
 Drew Bollman – engineering
 Jeff Braun – engineering, programming
 Lindsay Ell – electric guitar, songwriting, primary vocals, background vocals
 Ted Jensen – engineer
 Alyson McAnally – assistant producer
 Jake Moss – digital editing
 Jerry Roe – drums, percussion
 Justin Schipper – steel guitar
 Jordan Schmidt – digital editing, production, programming, recording, songwriting
 Jimmy Lee Sloas – bass guitar
 Ilya Toshinskiy – guitar, acoustic guitar, mandolin
 Geoff Warburton – songwriting
 Derek Wells – electric guitar
 Alex Wright – Hammond B-3 organ, piano, synthesizer

Charts

References

2022 songs
2022 singles
Lindsay Ell songs
BBR Music Group singles
Songs written by Lindsay Ell
Songs written by Geoff Warburton
Songs written by Jordan Schmidt